Eupatorium quaternum is a plant species in the family Asteraceae.

References

quaternum